The Pinch is a biannual literary magazine published at the University of Memphis. Works previously published in the magazine has been reprinted in the Best American Essays and Best American Nonrequired Reading, or have won a Pushcart Prize.

The magazine was founded by William Page in 1980, under the name Memphis State Review. Its name was changed to River City in 1988 and to The Pinch in 2006. The name "The Pinch" comes from Memphis' old Jewish ghetto, as detailed by Memphis writer Steve Stern.

Awards
Steve Adams' "Touch" was featured in the 2014 Pushcart Prize anthology.
Lee Sharkey's "8x8" was featured in the 2013 Pushcart Prize anthology.
Michael Poore's "The Street of the House of the Sun" was reprinted in Best American Nonrequired Reading 2012.
Michelle Seaton's "How To Work a Locker Room" was reprinted in Best American Nonrequired Reading 2009.
Ander Monson's "Solipsism" was reprinted in Best American Essays 2008.
Anis Shivani's "Dubai" was shortlisted for the Pushcart Prize in 2008.

See also
List of literary magazines

References

External links 

 Review of The Pinch by The Review Review

1980 establishments in Tennessee
Biannual magazines published in the United States
Literary magazines published in the United States
Magazines established in 1980
Magazines published in Tennessee
University of Memphis
Mass media in Memphis, Tennessee